Desudava Glacier is the 15.5 km long and 5 km wide glacier on Nordenskjöld Coast in Graham Land, Antarctica situated south of Dinsmoor Glacier and east-northeast of Boryana Glacier.  It is draining the northeast slopes of Gusla Peak and adjacent slopes of Detroit Plateau further north, the south slopes of Ivats Peak and the west slopes of Mount Elliott, and flowing southwards into Mundraga Bay next east of Boryana Glacier.

The feature is named after the ancient Thracian town of Desudava in southwestern Bulgaria.

Location
British mapping in 1978.

Maps
 Antarctic Digital Database (ADD). Scale 1:250000 topographic map of Antarctica. Scientific Committee on Antarctic Research (SCAR), 1993–2016.

References
 Desudava Glacier. SCAR Composite Antarctic Gazetteer.
 Bulgarian Antarctic Gazetteer. Antarctic Place-names Commission. (details in Bulgarian, basic data in English)

External links
 Desudava Glacier. Copernix satellite image

Bulgaria and the Antarctic
Glaciers of Nordenskjöld Coast